Musa Soltan Torkaman was one of the Qizilbash leaders of Mawsillu tribe and Safavid governor of Azerbaijan under Tahmasp I.

Background 
His father Isa beg was a son of Bakr beg Mawsillu (d. 1491), a governor of Astarabad and a loyal follower of Ya'qub Beg of Aq Qoyunlu. According to some sources, his daughter Sultanum Begum was married to Tahmasp I  and hence was a grandfather of Mohammad Khodabanda and Ismail II. However, according to Kioumars Ghereghlou, he was a brother to Sultanum Begum. He was appointed as governor of Azerbaijan following former governor Ulama soltan Takalu's defection to Ottoman Empire. After 3 years of rule he had to flee from Tabriz following Suleiman the Magnificent's campaign and widespread plague among his troops. He was described as an official given into "mirth, play, conversation and wine".

References

Safavid governors of Azerbaijan
Iranian Turkmen people
16th-century people of Safavid Iran
Safavid military officers
Mawsillu